Cyperus malaccensis or short-leaved Malacca galingale is a species of thin, long plant called a sedge. It is planted in the land between the sea water and fresh water, mainly in Vietnam, and processed in Dongguan.

It is used in packaging goods in South China, mainly before the 1980s. At that time people packaged goods by wrapping them in sedge. It was common to use a long loop to tie up the package, to aid carrying with the index finger. It was mostly replaced by plastic bags but is still used to package zongzi and Chinese mitten crab. However, liquid in the food may drip out when walking, which led to the use of the plastic bags. There are few people left growing and selling it.

For packaging dry goods, Cyperus malaccensis can provide a cheap, biodegradable and readily available alternative to plastic bags. In 2007 a Hong Kong student group interested in environmentalism called Greeners Action began a campaign wherein they hoped that more than 130 shops in 6 Hong Kong markets would use the sedge instead of plastic bags.

See also 
 List of Cyperus species

References

External links
 https://web.archive.org/web/20071031052725/http://www.noplasticbags.hk/

Packaging
malaccensis
Plants described in 1791